Everything is Everything is the third album from hip hop group Brand Nubian and the second released by the trio of Sadat X, Lord Jamar, and DJ Sincere. The album received mixed reviews and mediocre sales at the time of its release, despite a pair of popular singles, "Word Is Bond" and "Hold On." The album is completely produced by Lord Jamar except the Sadat X solo song "Alladat," which was produced by D.I.T.C. member Buckwild.

Track listing
All tracks produced by Lord Jamar, except track 5 produced by Buckwild.

Charts

Singles

References

1994 albums
Brand Nubian albums
Elektra Records albums
Albums produced by Buckwild